On January 5, 2002, Charles J. Bishop, a high-school student of East Lake High School in Tarpon Springs, Florida, United States, stole a Cessna 172 light aircraft and crashed it into the side of the Bank of America Tower in downtown Tampa, Florida. The impact killed the teenager and damaged an office room, but there were no other injuries.

Bishop had been inspired by the September 11 attacks; he had left a suicide note crediting Osama bin Laden for the attacks and praising it as a justified response to actions against the Palestinians and Iraqis and said he (Bishop) was acting on behalf of Al Qaeda, from whom he had turned down help. As officials could find no other evidence of any connections, terrorism as a motive was ruled out, and they suggested that the crash was an apparent suicide. Bishop's mother filed, then dropped, a lawsuit claiming that psychological side effects from isotretinoin, an acne medicine Bishop took, which can include depression and rarely suicidal actions, caused the incident.

Flight
At 5:00 p.m. EST, 15-year-old Charlie J. Bishop's flight instructor left him at the plane to perform basic preflight inspection. Once he was left alone inside the plane, he started the engine and took off without permission. As soon as the plane took off, the air traffic controllers alerted the United States Coast Guard and MacDill Air Force Base. Despite repeated warnings from a helicopter dispatched by the Coast Guard, the small plane continued on in flight until it crashed into the Bank of America tower. The plane crashed between the 28th and 29th floors of the 42-story building.

Pilot
Bishop was a 15-year-old high-school student from Tarpon Springs, Florida. At the time of the incident, he was a student pilot and only authorized to fly with a Certified Flight Instructor.

Investigation and aftermath

An investigation followed the incident. Officials ruled out terrorism although eyewitnesses said that the plane made no apparent attempt to avoid hitting the building. Officials finally suggested that the crash was an apparent suicide. In addition, a note found in the wreckage stated that he voiced support for Osama bin Laden. However, there is no evidence that the teen had any connection with any terror group. A suicide note from Bishop was found stating:

Later authorities confiscated a computer from Bishop's parents' house to try to determine a motive for the incident. Moments after the incident, President George W. Bush was briefly informed about the incident and two unrelated crashes that same day.

In April 2002, transcripts obtained from the Federal Aviation Administration revealed new details about the incident, which included how close the small plane came to a Southwest Airlines flight.

Bishop's mother filed a $70 million (2002 USD) lawsuit against Roche Laboratories, who make an acne medicine called Accutane. According to the lawsuit claim, the medicine had side effects such as depression and suicidal actions, which the claim stated as the cause of the incident. The suit was dropped on June 26, 2007, by Bishop's mother, who stated she was physically and emotionally unable to continue the action.

After the incident took place, numerous security measures were taken. The FAA released a security notice on January 6, the day after the incident. The notice included security of the aircraft and regulations pertaining to underaged flight students. In addition, the EAA and other smaller aircraft organizations proposed more security of flight schools and small aircraft.

While authorities stated that the crash was due to an "abuse of trust" rather than a security breach, others argue for the need of increased security due to the simplicity of such actions.

See also
 B-25 Empire State Building crash
 2002 Pirelli Tower airplane crash
 2006 New York City plane crash
 2010 Austin suicide attack
 2014 Wichita plane crash
 2018 Horizon Air Q400 incident
 List of terrorist incidents, 2002

References

External links
 NTSB Report

2002 in Florida
2002 airplane crash
Aviation accidents and incidents in Florida
Aviation accidents and incidents in the United States in 2002
January 2002 events in the United States